Lebanon competed at the 2016 Summer Olympics in Rio de Janeiro, Brazil, from 5 to 21 August 2016. This was the nation's 17th appearance at the Summer Olympics. Lebanon did not attend the 1956 Summer Olympics in Melbourne, as a response to the Suez Crisis.

The Lebanese Olympic Committee sent a total of nine athletes, four men and five women, to compete in seven sports at the Games. The Lebanese team featured two returning Olympians from London 2012: American-born foil fencer Mona Shaito and world's top-ranked shooter Ray Bassil in the women's trap. Almost half of the roster, including Bassil and slalom canoeist Richard Merjan, were granted invitations by the Tripartite Commission to the Games, due to their recent achievements. Meanwhile, half-middleweight judoka and Brazil-raised athlete Nacif Elias, who was later disqualified for an allegedly illegal joint lock on Argentina's Emmanuel Lucenti in his opening bout, led the Lebanese squad as the nation's flag bearer in the opening ceremony.

Lebanon, however, failed to win its first Olympic medal, since the 1980 Summer Olympics in Moscow, where Greco-Roman wrestler Hassan Bchara took the bronze in the super heavyweight category.

Athletics
 
Lebanese athletes have so far achieved qualifying standards in the following athletics events (up to a maximum of 3 athletes in each event):

Track & road events

Canoeing

Slalom
Lebanon received an invitation from the Tripartite Commission to send Richard Merjan in the men's C-1 race, signifying the nation's Olympic debut in the sport.

Fencing

Lebanon entered one fencer into the Olympic competition. London 2012 Olympian Mona Shaito secured a spot in the women's foil as one of the two highest-ranked fencers from Asia outside the world's top 14 in the FIE Adjusted Official Rankings. She lost in her first bout.

Judo

Lebanon qualified one judoka for the men's half-middleweight category (81 kg) at the Games. Nacif Elias was ranked among the top 22 eligible judokas for men in the IJF World Ranking List of May 30, 2016. He lost in his first match.

Shooting
 
Lebanon has received an invitation from the Tripartite Commission to send London 2012 Olympian Ray Bassil in the women's trap, as long as the minimum qualifying score (MQS) was met by March 31, 2016. She failed to advance past the preliminary round.

Qualification Legend: Q = Qualify for the next round; q = Qualify for the bronze medal (shotgun)

Swimming

Lebanon received a Universality invitation from FINA to send two swimmers (one male and one female) to the Olympics. Both swimmers failed to advance past the preliminary round.

Table tennis

Lebanon entered one athlete into the table tennis competition at the Games. Mariana Sahakian secured the Olympic spot in the women's singles as the highest-ranked table tennis player coming from the West Asia zone at the Asian Qualification Tournament in Hong Kong. She lost and was eliminated in her first match.

References

External links 

 

Olympics
2016
Nations at the 2016 Summer Olympics